Virginia Commonwealth University School of Education is a school of education located in the United States city of Richmond. It is a core institution for Virginia's teachers.

History 
The School of Education was created in 1964 in part of the Richmond Professional Institute. By the decision of the state legislature, the school became a part of VCU in 1968. Roughly 3,800 students enrolled at VCU enroll in the School of Education.

Departments 
Department of Counselor Education
Department of Educational Leadership
Department of Founders of Education
Department of Health & Human Performance
Department of Special Education & Disability Policy
Department of Teaching and Learning
 Child Development Center

References 

1964 establishments in Virginia
Education in Richmond, Virginia
Educational institutions established in 1964
Education